Rotem Gafinovitz (born 9 June 1992) is an Israeli road cyclist, who rides for UCI Women's WorldTeam . She participated at the 2012 UCI Road World Championships. In September 2016 she was announced as part of the  squad for 2017.

Major results
Source:

Road

2010
 National Junior Road Championships
2nd Road race
2nd Time trial
2011
 3rd Time trial, National Road Championships
2012
 National Road Championships
2nd Road race
2nd Time trial
2013
 National Road Championships
2nd Road race
2nd Time trial
2015
 National Road Championships
1st  Road race
2nd Time trial
2016
 2nd Road race, National Road Championships
2017
 2nd Time trial, National Road Championships
2018
 National Road Championships
1st  Time trial
2nd Road race
2019
 National Road Championships
1st  Time trial
2nd Road race
 1st Tour of Arava
 6th Overall Gracia–Orlová
 9th Time trial, European Games
2021
 National Road Championships
1st  Time trial
2nd Road race
2022
 National Road Championships
2nd Time trial
3rd Road race

Mountain biking

2014
 2nd Cross-country, National Mountain Bike Championships
 2nd Salamina Mountain bike
 3rd Ma'alot Mountain bike
 3rd Malmédy Mountain bike
2015
 National Mountain Bike Championships
1st  Cross-country
3rd Marathon
 1st Ein HaShofet Mountain bike
 1st Mishmar Ha'Emeq Mountain bike
 1st Kiryat-Ata Mountain bike
 2nd Mishmar Ha'Emeq Mountain bike
 2nd Haifa Mountain bike (a)
 3rd Haifa Mountain bike (b)

References

External links
 
 
 

1992 births
Israeli female cyclists
Living people
People from Modi'in-Maccabim-Re'ut
European Games competitors for Israel
Cyclists at the 2019 European Games